At least four ships of the Chilean navy have been named Almirante Riveros:
  was the original name of the  
  was the name of the former , delivered to Chile in 1920 as part of the Almirante Williams class
 , a  launched as HNLMS Tjerk Hiddes in 1989 she was acquired in 2007

Chilean Navy ship names